Robert Beadell (June 18, 1925 – June 11, 1994) was an American composer.

Life 
After military service as a bandsman with the United States Marines during the Second World War, Beadell enrolled in the music program at Northwestern University in Evanston, Illinois, where his clarinet teacher, Dominick DiCaprio, encouraged him to study composition. At Northwestern his composition teachers were Robert Delaney and Anthony Donato, and he later studied with Leo Sowerby at the American Conservatory in Chicago, and with Darius Milhaud at Mills College. He first taught music theory and woodwinds at the Swinney Conservatory of Central Methodist College in Fayette, Missouri from 1950 to 1952, then joined the music faculty at the University of Nebraska in Lincoln, where he taught from 1954 to 1991. He died in 1994, a week before his 69th birthday

Works 
Beadell is best known for his choral compositions and arrangements, and music for jazz ensemble. He also wrote two symphonies, five film scores, song cycles, piano pieces, chamber music, and five stage works: an operetta, The Kingdom of Caraway (1957), a musical, Out to the Wind (1979, based on Willa Cather's short story "Eric Hermannson's Soul"), and three operas, The Sweetwater Affair (1960, produced 1961), The Number of Fools (1965–66, rev. 1976), and Napoleon (1972, produced 1973). In 1967, he was commissioned by the Lincoln Symphony Orchestra Association for Mirage Flates, for chorus and orchestra, using texts by Mari Sandoz. It was premiered on November 21, 1967, by the Lincoln Symphony Orchestra and Chorus, conducted by Leo Kopp, in a concert of American music to mark the beginning of Kopp's 22nd year as conductor of the orchestra.

Sources
 
 
 
 

1925 births
1994 deaths
20th-century classical composers
American male classical composers
American classical composers
American jazz composers
American male jazz composers
American musical theatre composers
American opera composers
Male opera composers
Central Methodist University
Jazz-influenced classical composers
Bienen School of Music alumni
Pupils of Darius Milhaud
University of Nebraska–Lincoln faculty
20th-century American composers
Northwestern University alumni
United States Marine Corps personnel of World War II
20th-century American male musicians